The Ministry of Defence Police (MDP) is a civilian special police force which is part of the United Kingdom's Ministry of Defence. The MDP's primary responsibilities are to provide armed security and counter terrorism services to designated high-risk areas, as well as uniformed policing and limited investigative services to Ministry of Defence property, personnel, and installations throughout the United Kingdom. The MDP are not military police and should not be confused with the Royal Military Police or any other British Service Police.  Service personnel often refer to the MDP by the nickname "MOD plod".

MDP officers are attested as constables under the Ministry of Defence Police Act 1987. All MDP officers are trained as Authorised Firearms Officers (AFOs) and 90% of those on duty are armed at any given time.

The force was originally formed in 1971 by the merger of three separate service constabularies: the Air Force Department Constabulary, the Army Department Constabulary, and the Admiralty Constabulary. The force, which consists of two divisions, is headquartered at RAF Wyton, Cambridgeshire.

The force has a number of specialised departments and also provides officers for international policing secondments; including overseas and training of resident police forces in these areas. These overseas missions are carried out under the mandates of the United Nations, NATO, or the Foreign and Commonwealth Office. Most recent overseas deployments have been to Afghanistan to train Afghan National Police (ANP) forces in policing skills.

The MDP underwent a significant restructuring as part of the coalition government's post 2010 austerity measures, and the Strategic Defence and Security Review. Its budget was cut from £360million to £180million and it was to lose 20% of its manpower and up to 50% of its stations by 2016. The new, smaller force will concentrate on "high end" tasks such as nuclear weapons security and mobile armed policing of the defence estate.

, the force had a workforce of around 2,549 police officers and 227 police staff based at numerous defence and infrastructure locations across the United Kingdom.   The MDP has the second highest number of officers trained as AFOs of any police force, after the Metropolitan Police Service, who as of March 2019, had 2,623 AFOs.

In 2016, MDP officers made 61 arrests. Comparatively, in the year ending March 2017, a territorial police forces with similar numbers of officers, Sussex Police, made 17,506 arrests.

History

The Ministry of Defence Police was formed in 1971 by the merger of three civil constabularies, the Air Force Department Constabulary (previously under the control of the Air Ministry), the Army Department Constabulary (previously under the control of the War Office), and the Admiralty Constabulary (previously under the control of the Admiralty).

These earlier constabularies were formed as a result of the Special Constables Act 1923, although their histories can be traced back much further as watchmen. Their powers came from different legislative sources. In 1984, the House of Commons Defence Select Committee recognised the difficulties under which the Ministry of Defence Police were operating; the committee's recommendations led to the passing of the Ministry of Defence Police Act 1987.

During the period 20042013 the MDP was part of the wider Ministry of Defence Police and Guarding Agency (MDPGA) together with the civilian uniformed Ministry of Defence Guard Service (MGS). As a result of cuts made to the UK defence budget, arising from the Strategic Defence and Security Review of 2010, the MDPGA was disbanded on 1 April 2013. The MDP returned to standalone police force status. The MGS was cut heavily and became part of the new Defence Infrastructure Organisation.

Function

The MDP's primary responsibility is protecting sites of national importance throughout the United Kingdom, mostly through provision of Authorised Firearms Officers (AFO) at high security sites. As such, it deals with both military personnel and civilians.

The Ministry of Defence's (MoD) requirement of the MDP is expressed in six core capabilities:
 Armed nuclear security
 Territorial policing and security
 Intelligence gathering and analysis to support the efficient and effective deployment of MDP resources
 The prevention, investigation and detection of fraud and corruption, and the theft of or criminal damage to key defence equipment and assets.
 To provide specialist civil policing support to defence and other international policing commitments, in support of UK government policy.
 To maintain specialist policing capabilities that can be deployed at short notice as part of the response to unforeseen requirements at defence establishments in the UK.

Deployment and locations

The MDP is currently deployed at approximately 36 defence locations around the United Kingdom. These include—but are no longer limited to—military establishments, defence housing estates, military training areas, the royal dockyards, and the Atomic Weapons Establishment. Since January 2008, the MDP has also taken on the role of providing armed security at four gas terminals in the UK, part of the critical national infrastructure. In February 2015, the MDP deployed officers to GCHQ Cheltenham on a full-time basis; this was in response to the 2014 increase to the UK threat level from international terrorism.

The MDP once had a presence at 120 MoD sites such as the Royal Arsenal, munitions and storage depots, Royal Ordnance Factories, and Defence Research Establishments. The end of both the Cold War and The Troubles in Northern Ireland, along with the subsequent closure of the Royal Arsenal, Woolwich, and the privatisation of entities such as the Royal Ordnance Factories reduced the number of sites that need an MDP presence. Many armed forces locations that previously relied upon the MDP for armed security have transferred that role to the Military Provost Guard Service. Some have retained an MDP presence for purely policing purposes, albeit in reduced numbers.

Jurisdiction

MDP officers are attested as constables in one of the three jurisdictions of the United Kingdom: England & Wales, Scotland and Northern Ireland, but can exercise their powers in matters relating to the Ministry of Defence Estate throughout the United Kingdom, and additionally in the circumstances described below. MDP officers' natural geographic jurisdiction relates to MOD property and land as set out in section 2 of the Ministry of Defence Police Act 1987, which was amended by the Anti-terrorism, Crime and Security Act 2001.  MDP officers also have police jurisdiction in relation to certain persons connected with the MOD, crime related to the MOD and the escorting of the movement of MOD property anywhere in the United Kingdom.

The MDP is classified by the Serious Organised Crime and Police Act 2005 as a special police force. This gives MDP officers conditional allowance to exercise the powers available to a constable of a territorial police force if an offence or incident is encountered outwith their natural jurisdiction. Additionally, the MDP is able to provide officers and specialist units to territorial police forces on a mutual assistance basis.

MDP officers are able to take on the powers of constables of territorial police forces, or other special police forces, such as British Transport Police, in certain situations. This is known as 'extended jurisdiction' and use of these powers is set out in the Ministry of Defence Police Act (as amended). Protocols are in place which govern the relationships between the MOD Police and local forces under these circumstances.

Policing protocols with other forces
Local agreements with territorial police forces are made under the overarching general protocols agreed between the MDP chief constable and other chief constables. These set out the agreed working relationship between the MDP and other police forces; outlining, where necessary, areas of responsibility and accountability. The protocols make provision for consultation and co-operation between the forces, with the aim of delivering the best policing on the ground.

Oversight
Unlike the other special police forces in the United Kingdom, the MDP does not have a police authority to oversee the functions of the force; however, the Ministry of Defence Police Committee, established by the Ministry of Defence Police Act 1987, advises the Secretary of State for Defence on matters concerning the MDP. The committee (or its members) also has various functions in determining police misconduct and appeals cases.

According to the terms of reference of the MOD Police Committee, the committee is responsible for:
 providing scrutiny and guidance to ensure that police powers and authority are impartially and lawfully exercised by the chief constable
 confirming that the MDP is meeting the standards required of a police force
 confirming that the MDP's exercise of its authority is responsible, proportionate and impartial
 confirming that MoD's use of the MDP is appropriate in relation to the exercising of policing powers and authority
 providing scrutiny and guidance on matters of efficiency and effectiveness and on any other matter in relation to the use of policing powers which fall within the responsibility of the MDP
 considering the MDP's targets, financial performance and risk management arrangements
 providing advice once a year to the top-line budget holder covering financial performance and risk management for inclusion in the Annual Assurance Report
 assisting in the appointment of chief officers to the MDP
 considering all complaints made against MDP chief officers (this responsibility may be delegated to a sub-panel of the committee)
 undertaking all responsibilities required of the MDP Conduct and Appeal Regulations
 submitting an annual report to the Defence Secretary on the MDP's discharge of policing powers, and providing advice to ministers and the department, on matters concerning value for money and efficiencies
 publishing the operating costs and expenses of the committee each year

Command structure
Since 1995, its headquarters was located at the former United States Air Force base at Wethersfield, presently designated MDP Wethersfield. Force-wide command and control facilities were provided from the Central Control Room and Gold Command Suite. Wethersfield was also home to the Force Training Centre, which was responsible for the initial training and development of all MDP Constables. The MDP uses the standard British rank structure with its own Chief Constable, the rank structure can be seen below:

The MDP has two land-based functional divisions (reduced from five geographic divisions as part of SDSR in April 2012):
 Nuclear Division
 Territorial Division

Each division is commanded by a chief superintendent and has its own support groups which are able to respond at short notice to any unforeseen incident or emergency. Each station is commanded by a senior police officer who will vary in rank from sergeant to superintendent depending on the station's size, role and staffing.

Personnel
, the force strength was around 2,594. According to the 201920 Policing Plan, the MDP has a workforce of around 2,900 police officers and 260 police staff based at numerous defence locations across the United Kingdom.

Entry requirements
Entry requirements for new officers are similar to UK territorial police forces; however, because all MDP officers can carry firearms, the eyesight focal acuity standard and basic fitness standard is higher. Entrants must also be British nationals. The MDP recruits nationally and new entrants may be given a posting anywhere in the UK. In practice, most new entrants are initially posted to nuclear division; either at one of the two AWE establishments in South East England or one of the stations in Western Scotland.

Officers were formerly selected via the College of Policing's SEARCH process. This was replaced in 2017 by a one-day Recruit Assessment Centre (RAC) developed specifically for the MDP. This process includes a briefing, candidate presentation, competency based interview, numerical assessment, verbal reasoning assessment, report writing exercise and bleep test to level 7.6.

Initial training
MDP recruits are trained at the Force Training Centre at MOD Southwick Park on a 12-week fully residential course. The program follows the College of Policing initial learning and development syllabus. An MDP anomaly is that there are separate English Law and Scottish Law classes dependent on the individual officer's posting. Recruits are trained in personal safety including PAVA, extendable baton and kwikcuffs.
The final stage of the course includes the police basic driver assessment and an eight-week Authorised Firearms Officer course held at one of several Firearms Training Centres across the UK.

Security clearance
In addition to pre-entry security checks, all MDP officers are required to hold at least UK Government Security Check (SC) clearance (which clears the holder to UK Secret level). All Nuclear Division officers, and about 30% of all other officers, are required to hold Developed Vetting (DV) status, which involves an extensive background investigation and formal interviews. DV status clears the officer to UK Top Secret level.

Those officers working with US Forces in the UK are required to hold a US Common Access Card for which the US Government carries out its own security checks on the officer.

Terms and conditions

New entrants perform a two-year probationary period.

, the starting pay for newly recruited MDP constables is £25,346. New recruits are entitled to 22 days leave, which rises to 30 days after 20 years service.

Discipline in the MDP is governed by the Ministry of Defence Police (Conduct) Regulations 2009, which broadly resemble the Police (Conduct) Regulations 2008 that govern territorial police forces. MDP officers retain a full national mobility liability, and can be posted anywhere in the UK at any time. In practice most movement is voluntary, either on promotion or requested moves for personal reasons.

MDP pay follows the same scale as territorial police forces; however, MDP officers are part of the Civil Service Pension Scheme, not the Police Pension Scheme and only contribute 3.5% of their gross salary, compared to territorial police force officers who contribute 11%. To even out this anomaly, MDP officers pay is abated. This is known as the MDP Net Pay Deduction.

The MDP operates a random and 'with cause', alcohol and drugs screening policy. An annual fitness test for all AFOs is to be introduced.

MDP officers are eligible for the Principal Civil Service Pension Scheme (ALPHA).

Defence Police Federation

The MDP has its own federation (i.e., trade union) separate from Home Office police federations. The Defence Police Federation (DPF) was created in 1971 and has legal status by provision of the Ministry of Defence Police Act 1987. The DPF functions in a similar fashion to a trade union, with membership being voluntary, except that — like all UK police forces — officers do not have the right to take strike action.

The DPF has in recent years concentrated its efforts on what it sees as unfair conditions leveled on MDP Officers in comparison to other Home Office (HO) and Special Police forces. These include:

 Pay – MDP Officers are only paid 95% of the salary other officers receive. This includes Civil Nuclear Constabulary(CNC) Officers, who now have full pay parity with HO Forces.
 Pension – MDP Officers are currently enrolled as part of the Civil Service Alpha Pension scheme on joining, not the standard police pension scheme.
 Retirement age – MDP Officers are currently expected to work until age 65. This includes qualifying yearly as an AFO and completing the bleep test to 7.6. The DPF is currently co-operating with a study by the University of Loughborough to determine how realistic these fitness expectations are of officers as they age.

Uniform, armament and equipment

Uniform

The majority of MDP officers are employed on firearms duties and wear black polo-type shirts and trousers with black jackets. Headdress depends on role, and is either a police baseball cap, or the standard UK police checkered peaked cap (for men) or bowler hat (for women). Officers are still issued with custodian helmets and those engaged in general police duties, such as Defence Community Police Officers, may wear them while on patrol. Ballistic body armour is issued to all officers, and a black Kevlar helmet can also be worn by officers engaged on firearms duties, when required. Specialist MDP officers of the Tactical Firearms Unit and Special Escort Group often wear dark blue Nomex overalls operationally.

The tunic dress uniform worn by MDP officers is almost identical to that of the Metropolitan Police Service, apart from insignia.

Armament

Aside from their personal body armour, PAVA incapacitation spray, batons and Hiatt speedcuffs, MDP officers are trained to use firearms and about 90% are armed at any one time.

Most officers are armed with the force weapon, the Heckler & Koch MP7, while some specialist units use weapons such as the Heckler & Koch MP5 and/or the Diemaco C8. Such units include those working within the Government Security Zone, the Tactical Firearms Unit and Special Escort Group. Some officers carry a SIG P229 sidearm, however this is being phased out in favour of the Glock 17 Gen 4. All armed officers carry (or have immediate access to) Less-lethal weapons which are the Taser and/or 37mm AEP Baton Launcher.

Officers within the Nuclear Division and those working with nuclear weapons or special nuclear material carry the Colt Canada C8 (L119A2) assault rifle, fitted with the Trijcon dual ACOG sight.

Vehicles

The MDP uses a variety of vehicles, from general patrol cars to specialised escort vehicles, police launches, and off-road vehicles. In 2006, the force adopted the 'Battenburg' system of retro-reflective markings for its new vehicles. This brings the MDP's fleet appearance in line with most other UK police forces.

AWE stations and the Special Escort Group use the Armoured MacNeillie Mercedes Protected Patrol Vehicle. Where used on public roads, these are coloured dark blue, with Battenburg markings. When used only within Ministry of Defence establishments, they are coloured olive drab with black 'Police' markings. This vehicle replaced the MDP's previous armoured vehicle, the Alvis Tactica, in 2010.

Special capabilities

Marine unit
The MDP has a large marine fleet. The marine support units are responsible for the waterborne security of Her Majesty's Dockyards and HM Naval Bases. The marine support units are based at HMNB Portsmouth, HMNB Devonport and HMNB Clyde. At HMNB Clyde, the marine unit works with the Fleet Protection Group Royal Marines.

see also – island-class patrol vessel (2013)

Chemical, biological, radiological or nuclear response

Although only constituting 1.5% of the national police force, the MDP has 8% of the national chemical, biological, radiological and nuclear (CBRN) response capability. Officers deployed to Nuclear Division are trained in CBRN defence and to work in radiologically controlled environments. The force maintains a large pool of specially-trained officers nationally, known as the Nuclear Guard Force (NGF), who can be deployed at short notice in the event of a nuclear accident; they perform this function alongside the UK's national Nuclear Accident Response Organisation (NARO).

Dog sections

The MDP has the second largest number of police dogs of any UK police force and utilises explosive, drug, tactical firearms support, and general purpose police dogs.

Special Escort Group

The MDP Special Escort Group protects nuclear weapons and defence special nuclear material in transit.

Criminal Investigation Department
The MDP has a Criminal Investigation Department that works throughout the UK. The CID investigates defence-related crime, including serious fraud. There are a number of specialised units that fall under the larger CID remit. Officers employed within these specialised units must first qualify as a detective. Such units include:
 Force Intelligence Bureau: The FIB consists of a number of specialists, such as Crime Intelligence Officers, CHIS handlers, Communications Data Investigators (SPoCs), and Special Branch officers who support other investigators, carry out investigations, and gather operational intelligence in cases that merit their attention.
 Crime Scene Investigation: The Force has a small number of Crime Scene Investigators (CSI), formally known as Scenes of Crime Officers (SOCO).
 Major Incident Unit: The Major Incident Unit (MIU) is a group of specially-trained investigators who provide oversight and management of incidents that have caused serious disruption, or in support of complex investigations. Officers in the MIU are trained in the use of the HOLMES software suite and have a variety of specialist equipment at their disposal.

Central Support Groups
The Force has three Central Support Groups (CSGs), which provide regional support where additional resources are needed. These are located at Aldershot, Bicester and Scotland.

Operational Support Units

Operational Support Units (OSU). The OSU is the MDP's mobile, flexible reserve. Each OSU is a rapid response unit tasked with operational support, public order and anti-terrorist search duties. The force has two OSU units, one covering the north of the country, the other covering the south. OSU South was based at MDPGA Wethersfield, OSU North is based at RAF Linton-on-Ouse.

Tactical Firearms Unit
The Tactical Firearms Unit is a specialist group of officers within the AWE Division. MDP TFU is tasked with, and equipped to provide, an advanced firearms response capability at short notice to the Atomic Weapons Establishment. The TFU specialises in dynamic entry and dynamic intervention inside Nuclear Weapons facilities; including, if necessary, the recapture of Nuclear Weapons and special nuclear material.

Defence community police officers
DCPOs are unarmed MDP officers who provide community policing to Defence establishments or large military housing estates, in a similar manner to the Neighbourhood Policing Teams of territorial police forces. DCPOs generally work in single-officer posts and often work from within defence community centres or service police stations. In 2013, the number of Defence sites covered by Defence community police officers was cut, from over 40 locations nationwide to 16 locations.

Project Servator
The MDP has been implementing Project Servator as a new effects-based policing tactic since 2016 to deter and detect criminal and terrorist activity, as well as to reassure the various communities they serve. Project Servator tactics provide a strategic approach to defending sites that the MDP protects and are part of the Force's drive to deploy resources efficiently and effectively within its Operational Policing Model. Project Servator is utilised in and around the sites that the MDP protect across the UK, including HMNB Portsmouth, AWE Aldermaston,AWE Burghfield, HMNB Clyde, RNAD Coulport, HMNB Devonport and Whitehall. A surge capability is also available where required. The MDP work closely with: Police Scotland, Metropolitan Police Service, City of London Police, MOD Guard Service and British Transport Police, who also operate Project Servator in the areas close to the communities that the MDP serves.

International policing
The MDP has carried out a number of international policing activities, including overseas and training of local police forces in these areas. These overseas missions have been conducted under the mandates of the United Nations, NATO, Ministry of Defence, and the Foreign and Commonwealth Office. MDP officers employed overseas are typically armed for personal protection.

The MDP has been one of the largest contributors of UK police officers to overseas policing missions, with the majority deployed to Kosovo and Afghanistan.

The MDP have provided officers to police contingents in many locations around the world, including:

The MDP also provided policing for the Pitcairn Islands from around 2000 until 2007, when the islands employed their own full-time police officer.

Notable incidents and investigations
 1997: Milos Stankovic: British Army officer Major Milos Stankovic , whose father was a Serbian, was arrested and interviewed by the MDP in 1997 under the Official Secrets Act acting on information that alleged that he, while serving as a Serbo-Croat interpreter for senior British Army officers in Sarajevo, passed sensitive information to the Bosnian Serbs. During the investigations, MDP officers interviewed more than 100 witnesses in Britain and abroad. But the investigation, which cost more than £250,000, found no evidence of espionage. The case did not proceed to trial. Stankovic went to the press, and sued the MDP for £1 million compensation. In 2007, Mr Justice Saunders threw out the majority of his case and awarded just £5,000 for the MDP "seizing and removing items outside the terms of a search warrant" but making Stankovic liable for all costs (circa £500,000) "
 1998, Tony Geraghty: British–Irish author and journalist Tony Geraghty was arrested and his house searched by MDP Special Branch, investigating offences against the Official Secrets Act involving his contact with a former Northern Ireland bomb disposal officer Lt Col Nigel Wylde. Wylde was subsequently charged with passing secrets to Geraghty, but the case collapsed during trial. It led to criticism in the media that the MDP was beyond public accountability and had the power to impede the freedom of the press.
 2003–2004, Pitcairn Island Child Abuse investigations (Operation Unique): MDP officers were deployed to Pitcairn as part of the international investigation team into communal child sexual abuse on the island.
 7 July 2005, Response to London suicide bombings: Operation Toga saw a significant deployment of firearms officers on a non-Ministry of Defence tasking, to assist the Metropolitan Police to counter the threat of further suicide attacks in Central London.
 2001–2005, Deepcut Barracks suspicious deaths of four soldiers: MDP CID Involvement in investigations, which later led to a complaint to the Independent Police Complaints Commission by the deceased's families, who refused to believe police conclusions that each of the deaths by shooting of the soldiers was suicide, but an independent review by Nicholas Blake QC in 2007 absolved Surrey Police and MDP of any wrongdoing, but was highly critical of the Army. The events of the deaths are the subject of the stage play "Deep Cut" by Philip Ralph.
 2006, Ipswich Prostitute Murders: MDP provided an OSU and 100 additional officers for searches and enquiries at the request of Suffolk Constabulary following the murder of five women by Steve Wright
 26 January 2009, Death of Krzysztof Lubkiewicz: The IPCC investigated the MDP after the death of a Polish national immediately after contact with MDP officers. The officers themselves were later exonerated; however, the IPCC criticised the MDP's divisional control room's procedures, and their communication with other forces. This was the first investigation of the MDP by the IPCC after its jurisdiction was extended to include the MDP in 2008.
 29 September 2010: The leak of Secretary of State for Defence Liam Fox's letter to Prime Minister David Cameron: MDP CID London and OSU South were tasked to search MoD Headquarters in Whitehall, and carry out an investigation to uncover the person(s) responsible for leaking a highly damaging letter from Defence Secretary Liam Fox to Prime Minister David Cameron, to the press. In the letter, Fox expressed grave concerns about forthcoming defence cuts. No one was ever charged.
 8 August 2011: The 2011 England riots. Two days after the riots began, as a result of a direct tasking from the Home Office, the Chief Constable MDP deployed all available MDP public order officers to the Metropolitan Police Area to assist with restoration and the maintenance of public order in London. MDP General Police Duties officers were also sent to reinforce Essex police, to backfill for Essex officers who had been sent into London.
 24 May 2017 Manchester Arena bombing MOD police officers were deployed to assist Kent police, Nottinghamshire police, and Leicestershire police among others as part of Operation Temperer

Affiliated police forces
The Ministry of Defence also has responsibility for two other civilian police forces:
 The Sovereign Base Areas Police (SBAP), Cyprus: The SBAP provide a full range of policing for both the Eastern and Western Sovereign Base Areas of Cyprus.
 The Gibraltar Defence Police (GDP): The GDP provide police services on Ministry of Defence land and waters in Gibraltar.

Officers from both these forces occasionally attend courses at the Ministry of Defence Police Training College at Wethersfield, Essex. In June 2005, officers from the GDP marine unit gave assistance to the MoD Police marine unit at Portsmouth during the Trafalgar 200 celebrations.

See also
 Northern Ireland Security Guard Service
 Germany Guard Service
 United States Department of Defense Police
 List of law enforcement agencies in the United Kingdom, Crown Dependencies and British Overseas Territories
 Law enforcement in the United Kingdom
 Royal Navy Police
 Royal Military Police
 Royal Air Force Police
 Special Investigation Branch

References

External links

 
 Official Defence Police Federation video
 TalkThrough, The Force magazine
 MDP on MoD website

 
Ministry of Defence (United Kingdom)
Government agencies established in 1971
Organisations based in Essex
National police forces of the United Kingdom
1971 establishments in the United Kingdom
Civilian police forces of defense ministries
Agency-specific police departments of the United Kingdom